Spain has participated in the biennial classical music competition Eurovision Young Musicians eight times since its debut in 1988, most recently taking part in 2018, after a 16-year absence. The country's best result is a second-place finish in 1992, the only time in which they qualified for the televised final.

Participation overview

See also
Spain in the Eurovision Song Contest
Spain in the Eurovision Dance Contest
Spain in the Junior Eurovision Song Contest
Spain in the Eurovision Young Dancers

References

External links 
 Eurovision Young Musicians

Countries in the Eurovision Young Musicians